QPR Software Plc is a Finnish software firm providing management software products in process mining, process and enterprise architecture modelling, and performance management. Founded in 1991 and headquartered in Helsinki, QPR Software is listed on the Helsinki Stock Exchange.

Products 
 QPR Process Analyzer, an enterprise-grade software product for advanced process mining
 QPR Enterprise Architect, enterprise architecture modeling software
 QPR Metrics, a tool for measuring strategy execution and performance management, also supporting balanced scorecard methodology
 QPR Process Designer, a tool for quality assurance, business process modelling and Six Sigma software packages

Awards 
In 2022, QPR Software Plc was identified as a "Leader in Process Discovery and Mining in the ISG Provider Lens Intelligent Automation  Solutions and Services 2021 report in the Nordics".

References 

Companies listed on Nasdaq Helsinki
Finnish companies established in 1991
Software companies established in 1991